Andrew "Andy" John David Keen is a Canadian documentary filmmaker whose films include Bobcaygeon starring The Tragically Hip (2012), Escarpment Blues starring Sarah Harmer, and the documentary Seven Painters Seven Places (1999). He was a director of photography on "Know Your Mushrooms" (2009), directed by Ron Mann. Keen has worked as director and cameraman on numerous television commercials and music videos, and in 2010 he was honoured with a Webby Award in the category of Activism for a series of online videos he produced for The Canadian Stem Cell Foundation. Bobcaygeon is a feature film about Canadian rock band The Tragically Hip and their riotous concert in Bobcaygeon. The film had its World Premiere at the 2012 Vancouver International Film Festival (VIFF) and in April 2013 won the Juno Award for Music DVD of the Year.

Biography 

Born to Bonnie and Martin Keen in Galt, Ontario, he moved frequently for the first five years of his life until the family settled in Oakville, Ontario. Keen studied at Bishop's University in Lennoxville, Quebec, and Ryerson University (now Toronto Metropolitan University) in Toronto, before completing a Bachelor of Fine Arts (Art History) at Concordia University in Montreal. A Ken Kesey inspired bus trip through the United States, where he met Oliver Stone in New Orleans, decided his career in film. After graduating, Keen moved to Toronto, where he began work in the film and television industry as a production assistant. Keen founded Regular Horse Productions in 1997 to produce documentaries and related works.

Filmography 

 Bobcaygeon, 2012 (producer, director, editor (credited as Kenny None)
 Know Your Mushrooms, 2008 (credited as director of photography)
 Escarpment Blues, 2006 (producer, director, editor, camera)
 Seven Painters Seven Places, 1999 (director, editor, camera)

Awards 

 2000 Best Picture Editing in a documentary Gemini Award Nominee Seven Painters Seven Places (1999)
 2006 Music DVD of The year Juno Awards Escarpment Blues 2006
 2010 Winner People's Voice Award 2010 Webby Awards Best Website (Activism) www.stemcellcharter.org
 2011 Award of Merit Advertising and Design Awards "Manifest Moves Issues" 2010 
 2013 Music DVD of The Year 2013 Juno Awards "Bobcaygeon" 2012

References 
 "2013 Juno Award acceptance speeches" 
 "VIFF 2012 Interview"
 "Strombo's Picks for VIFF 2012"
 "Huffington Post VIFF Picks"
 "Vancouver Sun VIFF
 "Official Bobcaygeon Website"
 "VIFF Canadian Images Line-Up"
 "HIP Concert Film Turns Bobcaygeon Into A Star"
 "Singing the Escarpment Blues" SOCAN
 "Highlights" TVO April 2007
 "2007 Juno Awards"
 "Planet In Focus Film Festival"
 "Now Magazines Pics" 16 November 2006
 "Andy Keen" Internet Movie Data Base
 "Andy's Web Page"
 "Know Your Mushrooms: Fungus film on the button" Toronto: The Star 30 January 2009

Canadian documentary film directors
People from Cambridge, Ontario
Living people
Bishop's University alumni
Concordia University alumni
Year of birth missing (living people)
Canadian documentary film producers
Film directors from Ontario
Film producers from Ontario